Cheating Cheaters is a lost 1927 American silent film produced and distributed by Universal Pictures. It was directed by Edward Laemmle and starred Betty Compson.

This film was based on a 1916 Broadway play of the same name by Max Marcin.

A 1919 film of the same name was also based on Marcin's play. It was produced by and starred Clara Kimball Young.

Cast
Betty Compson - Nan Carey
Kenneth Harlan - Tom Palmer
Sylvia Ashton - Mrs. Brockton
Erwin Connelly - Mr. Brockton
Maude Turner Gordon - Mrs. Palmer
E. J. Ratcliffe - Mr. Palmer
Lucien Littlefield - 'Habeas Corpus' Lazarre
Eddie Gribbon - Steve Wilson
Cesare Gravina - Tony Verdi

References

External links
 
AllMovie.com
long poster

1927 films
American silent feature films
Lost American films
Films directed by Edward Laemmle
Silent American comedy films
1927 comedy films
Universal Pictures films
American black-and-white films
1927 lost films
Lost comedy films
1920s American films
1920s English-language films